The discography of classical pianist Lang Lang includes nine studio albums, four live albums, one single, one compilation, two soundtracks, and three contributions to releases not under his name. His first album was released in 2000 under Telarc International Corporation. In 2003, he signed a contract with Deutsche Grammophon and released several albums with them. In February 2010, Lang Lang signed with Sony Classic.

Lang Lang has recorded two soundtracks, including the score by Alexandre Desplat for the 2007 movie The Painted Veil. He has contributed to several albums of other musicians, including Andrea Bocelli's greatest hits album, The Best of Andrea Bocelli: Vivere. For the piece "Time for Dreams," on his 2008 album Dreams of China, Lang Lang collaborated with German electronica musician Christopher von Deylen. While Lang Lang has also worked with singers like Taiwanese R&B star Jay Chou and Chinese folk singer Song Zuying, none of these collaborations have been published.

Lang Lang has achieved considerable commercial and critical success. His albums have ranked on Billboard charts, including the Top Classical Albums chart.

Studio albums

Live albums

Singles

Compilations

Soundtracks

Contributions

References
General

 
 
 
 

Specific

External links

Discographies of classical pianists
Discographies of Chinese artists